Johan, or Jan Lagoor (1620–1660), was a Dutch Golden Age painter.

Biography
He was born in Gorinchem but moved to Haarlem by 1645 where he married and became a member of the Haarlem Guild of St. Luke. In 1649 he was a vinder of the guild and during the years 1645-1651 he was a member of the Haarlem schutterij. In 1653 he moved to Amsterdam where his daughter was baptized in 1658. He was declared bankrupt in 1659 and left the city, and nothing is known of him after that.

References

Jan Lagoor on Artnet

1620 births
1660 deaths
Dutch Golden Age painters
Dutch male painters
People from Gorinchem
Painters from Haarlem